Swetes is located in Saint Paul Parish on the island of Antigua, in Antigua and Barbuda.

Geography
With lowlands and valleys, the terrain of the Swete's region is nearly identical to that of Liberta, with the exception that there are less sharp hills. Since it is the area's flattest lowland, as opposed to Buckley's to the north and Folly Hill and John Hughes to the west, the majority of slaves who were freed after slavery lived in Swete. The owner followed the custom of selling unused estate properties to freed slaves.

History

Sweete's Estate 
The third son of the Rev. John Swete, Maine Swete, relocated to London around 1688 and then to a property on the island of Antigua. On July 15, 1701, a survey was conducted of Captain Main Swete's 337 acre plantation at Falmouth, Antigua. In 1704 and 1715, he served as a member of the Assembly. (1) He wed Grace Waldron. They didn't have any kids. In 1728, he went back to Devon and wed Esther Prickman. When his brother Adrian passed away without issue in 1733, he received Traine Manor as his inheritance. In trust for their three-year-old son Adrian John Swete, he gave Traine and other possessions to his wife Esther when he passed away in 1735.

The fourth Marquis of Vallado was Theodore Walrond (born 1701). Humphrey Walrond received the Spanish title of Marquis de Vallado from King Philip IV of Spain on August 5, 1653. He served as Barbados' governor as well. Main Swete Walrond (b.1725), the fifth Marquis, Joseph Lyons Waldron (1725–1815), the sixth Marquis, and Lyons Walrond (1800–1819), the seventh Marquis, all inherited the title from their ancestors. 

After 1726, Theodore Walrond married Mary Keynell, the governor's daughter.

Swetes Village History 
This community was given its name in honor of Main Swete, who built a plantation there in the early 1700s. He had traveled from South Devon's Modbury. He passed away in 1735 after serving in the House of Assembly from 1715 to 1715. Henry Gale acquired ownership of the 180-acre estate soon after freedom. Since the estate owners did not want to construct laborers' cottages after the great earthquake of 1843, Sweete's hamlet emerged about the time when its owner marked off a part of land for sale to laborers on the sugar estates in the middle of the 1840s.

Owners of the original property were Captain Main Swete and his wife Esther Swete, who held a 337-acre sugar plantation. The estate, and consequently the community, are located in Liberta's northwest region. Swetes came from a long line of British families with roots in Antigua. During its peak, the estate housed hundreds of slaves. On July 8, 1735, Main Swete was buried in England and left his inheritance to his widow Esther, who was living there at the time of his passing. Daniel Mathew later rented out the Swete Estate.

Demographics 
Swetes has five enumeration districts, As of 2011, it has a population of 1,720.

Enumeration Districts 

 70300 Swetes-NorthWest 
 70400 Swetes-North 
 70500 Swetes-Central 
 70600 Swetes-SouthWest 
 70700 Swetes-East

Census Data (2011)

People
Swetes is the birthplace of George Alexander McGuire, Patriarch of the African Orthodox Church. It is also the birthplace of Antiguan and West Indian cricketers Ridley Jacobs and Sir Curtly Ambrose.

References

Populated places in Antigua and Barbuda
Saint Paul Parish, Antigua and Barbuda